The Trans-Himalayan Multi-dimensional Connectivity Network (abbreviated as THMCN and sometimes referred to as the Trans-Himalayan network) is an economic corridor between Nepal and China and part of China's Belt and Road Initiative, a global development initiative that develops connectivity especially across Eurasia. During a state visit to Nepal in 2019, the corridor was hailed by Chinese President and General Secretary of the Communist Party Xi Jinping as changing Nepal "from a landlocked to a land-linked country."

Infrastructure
The corridor consists of several transportation infrastructure projects. The flagship infrastructure project is the China–Nepal railway, which currently at the stage of feasibility study. A number of highway projects are to be implemented including the construction of a tunnel road and upgrading of the Araniko Highway, which was shutdown after the Gorkha earthquake. The Araniko Highway ends at the border of the village of Kodari and the Chinese border crossing of Zhangmu. The border port is set for restoration under the initiative.

The projects also consist of internal improvements to Nepalese transport infrastructure including serving three north–south corridors of the country (Koshi Economic Corridor, Gandaki Economic Corridor and Karnali Economic Corridor). The intended projects include the Kathmandu-Pokhara-Lumbini extension of the China-Nepal railways and various highway projects in the Himalayan Valley.

References

Belt and Road Initiative